Lake Butler may refer to:
Lake Butler, Union County, Florida, a census-designated place
Lake Butler, Orange County, Florida, a census-designated place
Lake Butler Woman's Club, a building in Lake Butler, Union County, Florida
Lake Butler (Polk County, Florida), a lake in Haines City, Florida